The 1982 United States Senate election in Indiana was held on November 2, 1982. Incumbent Republican United States Senator Richard Lugar faced Democratic United States Representative Floyd Fithian in the general election. Lugar won with a margin of 53% of the vote, compared to Fithian's 46%. This was Lugar's closest election out of his 7 senate elections for the class 1 seat.

Republican primary

Candidates 
 Richard Lugar, incumbent U.S. Senator

Results 

Incumbent United States Senator Richard Lugar won the republican nomination in an uncontested primary on May 4, 1982.

Democratic primary

Candidates 
 Floyd Fithian, U.S. Representative from Tippecanoe County
 Michael Kendall, State Senator from Jasper

Campaign 

After the 1980 Census, the Indiana General Assembly redistricted Indiana's congressional districts, pushing Democratic representative Floyd Fithian's district into more conservative territory. After redistricting, Fithian, the three term incumbent of Indiana's 2nd congressional district, decided to run for Secretary of State of Indiana, but withdrew from the primary to ultimately run for the United States Senate. He challenged fellow Democrat and one term Indiana State Senator Michael Kendall of Jasper, Indiana, who Fithian earlier encouraged to run for the Senate. Kendall, who represented Indiana's 47th Senate district and formed the Notre Dame Students for Robert F. Kennedy organization during the 1968 presidential election, was seen a young progressive alternative to Fithian, who he called the "ideological twin of Richard Lugar." After the bitterly contested primary, Fithian prevailed over Kendall, winning with 59% of the vote.

Results

General election 

In the general election, Lugar faced Fithian and American Party candidate Raymond James.

On November 5, 1982, Lugar defeated Fithian and James in the general election, winning 74 of Indiana's 93 counties.

See also 
 1982 United States Senate elections
 1982 United States House of Representatives elections in Indiana

References 

1982
United States Senate
Indiana